Paul Berlenbach (February 18, 1901 – September 30, 1985) was the world light heavyweight boxing champion from May 30, 1925, when he wrested the crown from Mike McTigue, until July 16, 1926, when he was defeated by his nemesis Jack Delaney. The Ring Magazine founder Nat Fleischer rated him as the #10 best light heavyweight of all-time. Berlenbach was inducted into the Ring Magazine Hall of Fame in 1971 and the International Boxing Hall of Fame in 2001.

Professional career

World light heavyweight champion
Known as the "Astoria Assassin", Berlenbach was known for his punching power. The New York City-born Berlenbach was an AAU champion wrestler before turning to professional boxing in 1923. Eventually he scored a 10th-round TKO over former champion "Battling Siki" to earn a title shot against champion Mike McTigue.

Described by writer Paul Gallico as "untutored, unlettered, slow-witted, slow-moving, and wholly lacking in animation or imagination", Berlenbach was, nevertheless, a formidable fighter.  As Gallico noted, he possessed "a numbing, paralyzing body punch that caused his opponents suddenly to crumple up" as though shot.  His weaknesses were his non-existent defense, and slow movements which enabled sharp shooting opponents, such as Jack Delaney, to hit him at will.

Retirement
He retired with a record of 40 wins (33 KOs), 8 losses, and 3 draws. He was named #93 on the Ring Magazine's list of 100 greatest punchers of all time. Upon his retirement, he owned and operated Paul Berlenbach's Ringside Restaurant in Sound Beach, New York in the 1950s.

Professional boxing record

All newspaper decisions are officially regarded as “no decision” bouts and are not counted in the win/loss/draw column.

See also
List of light heavyweight boxing champions

References

External links

https://boxrec.com/media/index.php/The_Ring_Magazine%27s_Annual_Ratings:_Light_Heavyweight--1920s

1901 births
1985 deaths
Boxers from New York City
Light-heavyweight boxers
American male boxers